The Dancing Druids is a 1948 mystery detective novel by the British writer Gladys Mitchell. It is the twenty first in her long-running series featuring the psychoanalyst and amateur detective Mrs Bradley. The title refers to a group of prehistoric stones whose appearance resembles dancing druids.

Synopsis
In the West Country a cross country runner stumbles across a mysterious scene, and calls in Mrs Bradley who arrives with her various assistants.

References

Bibliography
 Craig, Patricia & Cadogan, Mary. The Lady Investigates: Women Detectives and Spies in Fiction. Orion Publishing Group 1981.
 Klein, Kathleen Gregory. Great Women Mystery Writers: Classic to Contemporary. Greenwood Press, 1994.
 Reilly, John M. Twentieth Century Crime & Mystery Writers. Springer, 2015.

1948 British novels
Novels by Gladys Mitchell
British crime novels
Novels set in England
British detective novels
Michael Joseph books